Design for Loving is a 1962 British comedy film directed by Godfrey Grayson and starring June Thorburn, Pete Murray and Soraya Rafat. Its plot concerns a beatnik who becomes a top fashion model. It is also known by the alternative title Fashion for Loving.

Plot
With an eye on the youth market, fashion executive Barbara Winters (June Thorburn) hires beatnik Stanford (Pete Murray) as her chief fashion adviser.  However, discovering Stanford is in reality Lord Stanford, leads to ensuing comic complications.

Cast

 June Thorburn - Barbara Winters
 Pete Murray - Lord Stanford
 Soraya Rafat - Irene
 James Maxwell - Joe
 June Cunningham - Alice
 Prudence Hyman - Lady Bayliss
 Michael Balfour - Bernie
 Edward Palmer - Graves
 John Bay - Freddie
 Marjie Lawrence - Mrs. Samson
 Katharine Page - Chaperone	
 Patsy Smart - Landlady	
 Mark Singleton - Karl	
 Charles Lamb - Walter
 Humphrey Lestocq - Manager
 Mary Malcolm - Compere
 Angela Douglas - Bernie's Secretary

Critical reception
TV Guide concluded that the film "...fails to produce much excitement, comic or otherwise."

References

External links

1962 films
Films directed by Godfrey Grayson
1962 comedy films
British comedy films
1960s English-language films
1960s British films